Flemming Lund (born 6 October 1952) is a former Danish professional football player in the midfielder position, who played both in Europe and the United States. He played for Royal Antwerp in Belgium and German teams Rot-Weiss Essen and Fortuna Düsseldorf, winning the 1979 DFB-Pokal trophy with Düsseldorf. Lund played 20 games and scored two goals for the Denmark national football team from 1972 to 1979. He  moved to the United States in 1979 and played for a number of American teams in the North American Soccer League and the Major Indoor Soccer League.

European career
Born in Copenhagen, Lund started his career with local top-flight club B 1903. He was called up for the Danish national under-19 team in September 1969, and went on to play seven games and score one goal for the under-19 national team until June 1971. He played six games for the Danish national under-21 team between June 1972 and May 1974. Simultaneously, he debuted for the senior Denmark national team in June 1972 and went on to play 20 games and score two goals for his country until May 1979.

In the summer of 1972, Lund moved abroad to play professionally with Belgian club Royal Antwerp. He made his Antwerp debut in August 1972, and went on to play 124 games and score 20 goals for Antwerp in the Belgian First Division. After four seasons with Antwerp, Lund went to Rot-Weiss Essen in the German Bundesliga championship in 1976. Lund played 34 games and scored two goals for Essen in the 1976–77 Bundesliga season, but could not prevent Essen from being relegated to the 2. Bundesliga at the end of the season. Lund left Essen and moved to Bundesliga club Fortuna Düsseldorf. He played two seasons at Düsseldorf, and won the 1979 DFB-Pokal trophy with the team. After 62 games and five goals for Düsseldorf in the Bundesliga, Lund left the club in the summer 1979.

American career
In 1979, Lund signed with the Dallas Tornado of the North American Soccer League.  He would remain with Dallas through three outdoor seasons.  In the fall of 1979, he joined the Detroit Lightning of the Major Indoor Soccer League and was named a first team All Star.  He then played the 1980–81 indoor season with the Tornado.  He returned to the MISL in the fall of 1981 with the Buffalo Stallions.  In 1983, he joined the Vancouver Whitecaps.  Seven games into the 1983 season, the Whitecaps sent Lund to the Tampa Bay Rowdies.  He finished the season in Tampa Bay, then played the 1983–84 NASL indoor season with them.  On 27 April 1984, the Rowdies released Lund.  In October 1985, he joined the Cleveland Force for the 1984–85 MISL season.  In February 1985, the Force sent Lund to the New York Cosmos in exchange for a second-round draft pick.  In March, the Cosmos released Lund who then signed with the Wichita Wings.

Personal
He is the father of international equestrian Tina Lund. He has won the Zealand championship in badminton with world champion Lene Køppen as his mixed-double partner.

Honours
 DFB-Pokal: 1978–79
 MISL All-Star Team: 1979–80

References

External links
Danish national team profile 

NASL/MISL stats

1952 births
Living people
Danish men's footballers
Denmark international footballers
Buffalo Stallions players
Cleveland Force (original MISL) players
Royal Antwerp F.C. players
Danish expatriate sportspeople in Belgium
Danish expatriate sportspeople in Canada
Danish expatriate sportspeople in West Germany
Danish expatriate sportspeople in the United States
Fortuna Düsseldorf players
Rot-Weiss Essen players
Dallas Tornado players
Belgian Pro League players
Bundesliga players
Expatriate footballers in Belgium
Expatriate footballers in West Germany
Expatriate soccer players in Canada
Expatriate soccer players in the United States
Detroit Lightning players
Danish expatriate men's footballers
Major Indoor Soccer League (1978–1992) players
North American Soccer League (1968–1984) indoor players
New York Cosmos (MISL) players
North American Soccer League (1968–1984) players
Tampa Bay Rowdies (1975–1993) players
Vancouver Whitecaps (1974–1984) players
Wichita Wings (MISL) players
Association football midfielders
Footballers from Copenhagen